Salaviinanpolttajat (The Moonshiners) is a Finnish film made in 1907. While only 20 minutes in length, it is generally considered the first fictional film made in the country and as such, the starting point of Finnish cinema industry.

Origin
The film's origins were in a screenplay writing contest commissioned by Atelier Apollo, owned by photographer and engineer Karl Emil Ståhlberg, who is now regarded as the father of Finnish cinema. The contest was won by the pseudonym "J. V-s", who some speculated was actually Ståhlberg himself, but other sources say he was a local sheriff. The screenplay was adapted and the film was directed by a friend of Ståhlberg, the Swedish count and artist Louis Sparre.

Plot
No prints of the film have been preserved so the film can be considered a lost film. The original screenplay has also been lost. However, some plot descriptions are still known based on contemporary newspaper advertisements of the film.

As the name would indicate, the film tells about two local men who are making moonshine in the woods. A customer comes to them, and while sampling the product they start a game of cards, which eventually leads to a fight. While the fight is going on, the local police shows up and arrests the makers while the customer manages to escape.

References

Further reading

External links

1907 films
Silent films
Finnish black-and-white films
Finnish short films
Lost Finnish films
1900s lost films